Zore is a surname. Notable people with the surname include:

Edward J. Zore (born 1945), American banker
Gregor Zore (born 1978), Slovenian footballer
Luko Zore (1846–1906), Serbian writer
Mohiuddin Qadri Zore (1905–1962), Indian writer, scholar, poet, literary critic, and historian